The 2013 British Superbike season was the 26th British Superbike Championship season. Shane Byrne stayed in the championship to defend his title from the previous season on the Paul Bird Kawasaki; Ryuichi Kiyonari returned to the championship on board the Samsung Honda to challenge for his fourth British Superbike Championship, with new team mate Alex Lowes looking to win his first championship after showing his pace at the end of the previous season. Josh Brookes stayed on board the Tyco Suzuki and James Ellison returned to try to win the illusive British title riding the Milwaukee Yamaha in what was billed to be the biggest title fight for years.

Race calendar and results
The 2013 MCE Insurance British Superbike Championship calendar was announced on 10 October 2012 by MSVR.

Entry list

Championship standings

Riders' Championship

References

External links
 The official website of the British Superbike Championship

British
British Superbike Championship
Superbike Championship